Bruno Ngotty (born 10 June 1971) is a French former professional footballer. He played as a centre-back from 1988 until 2008, however he came out of retirement briefly in 2011.

As well as his native country he has played in the top flight divisions in both Italy and England. He has notably played for Olympique Lyonnais, Paris Saint Germain, A.C. Milan, Olympique Marseille and Bolton Wanderers as well as earning six caps for France. He has also played for Venezia, Birmingham City, Leicester City and Hereford United. He came out of retirement to join French 6th tier side l'AS Lattes in 2011.

Early life
Ngotty was born in Lyon.

Club career

Lyon
Ngotty started his career with Olympique Lyonnais from the opening of the 1988–89 season to the close of the 1994–95 season. Ngotty managed to play 143 league games scoring 10 goals during his time at Lyon.

Paris Saint-Germain 
Bruno Ngotty scored the winning goal which defeated Austrian club Rapid Wien in the 1996 UEFA Cup Winners' Cup Final, giving Paris Saint-Germain their only cup triumph in the tournament. He was also included in the squad that reached the final again the next year, losing to Barcelona 1–0 at Feyenoord Stadion.

A.C. Milan 
Ngotty was part of the A.C. Milan team that won the Serie A title in 1999, making 25 league appearances for the club. He played alongside the likes of Paolo Maldini during his time there. He was sent on loan to Venezia during 1999 where he played 16 matches.

Marseille 
After his relatively short spell at Milan he returned to France with Olympique Marseille. This turned out to be an even shorter spell than his stay in Milan which lasted for one season. He managed to play in 31 games during his only season at the club.

Bolton Wanderers 
Ngotty originally rejected Bolton Wanderers' loan offer, but later agreed to spend the rest of the season with the club. The move eventually became a permanent deal. He made his Bolton debut against Blackburn Rovers, in a match which finished in a 1–1 draw, on 19 September 2001. He scored his debut goal for the club seven months later, his only goal of the season coming in a 3–1 defeat at Everton.

In January 2002, this move became permanent, Ngotty being cited as one of the prime chances for Bolton success. His first full season for the club started in unfortunate style, as he received two yellow cards and one red card in his first six games. After this rather disappointing start he became a regular part of the first team and was voted supporters player of the year for the 2005 season. He originally wanted to end his career at the Reebok Stadium, but with manager Sam Allardyce wanting to reduce the average age of the squad, Ngotty was released at the end of his contract in May 2006.

Birmingham City 
Ngotty was signed by Birmingham City on a one-year deal on 6 July. The team achieved promotion to the Premier League that same season, finishing as runners up. He decided not to take up the option of another year at Birmingham. He scored two goals during his stay at Birmingham, against QPR in the league and Newcastle in the FA Cup.

Leicester City 
On 4 June 2007, Ngotty moved to Leicester City on a free transfer, signing a two-year contract. Chairman Milan Mandarić revealed on 27 September that Ngotty was signed by him, and not then-manager Martin Allen, during a face-to-face meeting with the club's fans. Ngotty was named in the Championship Team of the Week following the club's 1–1 draw against Stoke City on 29 September, together with teammate Márton Fülöp. He played his 500th competitive game in an M69 Derby on 12 January 2008, in which Leicester won 2–0. Ngotty played a total of 38 league games as Leicester were relegated from the Championship.

When Nigel Pearson replaced Ian Holloway as the club's new manager, Ngotty played in only one pre-season game and was neither in the squad's tour of Slovenia nor the opening match of the season. On 25 September 2008, Ngotty joined Hereford United on loan for a month. Making his debut in Hereford's 1–0 defeat to Leeds United. The loan was extended for a further month on 25 October. However it was cut short after Ngotty suffered a serious injury in a match against Peterborough United, leaving the field after nine minutes with a suspected ruptured Achilles. On 29 May 2009, Ngotty was released at the end of his contract.

In January 2011, Ngotty joined French 6th-tier side l'AS Lattes.

International career 
Ngorry was born in France and is of Cameroonian descent. Though many observers predicted that Ngotty's international career was to be successful, he made only six appearances with Les Bleus, making his debut on 17 August 1994 against the Czech Republic alongside Zinedine Zidane and Lilian Thuram, but while the two were soon able to secure their places in the national team, Ngotty failed to impress Aimé Jacquet and played only five more matches until 1997, never being called up for a major event.

Career statistics

Honours
Paris Saint-Germain
Coupe de France: 1997–98
Coupe de la Ligue: 1997–98
Trophée des Champions: 1995
UEFA Cup Winners' Cup: 1995–96

A.C. Milan
Serie A: 1998–99

References

External links 
 
 Player Profile on lcfc.com
 
 
 

1971 births
Living people
Footballers from Lyon
French footballers
France international footballers
French sportspeople of Cameroonian descent
Association football defenders
Olympique Lyonnais players
Paris Saint-Germain F.C. players
A.C. Milan players
Venezia F.C. players
Olympique de Marseille players
Bolton Wanderers F.C. players
Birmingham City F.C. players
Leicester City F.C. players
Hereford United F.C. players
Ligue 2 players
Ligue 1 players
Serie A players
Premier League players
English Football League players
French expatriate footballers
Expatriate footballers in England
Expatriate footballers in Italy
French expatriate sportspeople in England
French expatriate sportspeople in Italy